
Year 742 (DCCXLII) was a common year starting on Monday (link will display the full calendar) of the Julian calendar. The denomination 742 for this year has been used since the early medieval period, when the Anno Domini calendar era became the prevalent method in Europe for naming years.

Events 
 By place 
 Europe 
 King Liutprand of the Lombards meets Pope Zachary at Terni (Central Italy), who appeals to the king's religious faith. Liutprand is a pious Catholic and signs a 20-year peace treaty, restoring the cities of the Duchy of Rome which he has captured. The independent Lombard duchies of Spoleto and Benevento absorb into the Lombard Kingdom.
Arab-Byzantine Wars: Arab forces under Sulayman ibn Hisham invade Anatolia, reaching as far as Herakleia, and return with much wealth & livestock. 
 Umayyad conquest of Hispania: Arab forces under Abd al-Malik ibn Katan al-Fihri, governor (wali) of Al-Andalus, suppress the Berber rebellion in the region of Mértola (modern Portugal).
 Teodato Ipato succeeds his father Orso Ipato, as the fourth doge of Venice. He moves the capital from Heraclea to Malamocco.

 Africa 
 The Great Berber Revolt: Muslim forces under Handhala ibn Safwan al-Kalbi, governor of Egypt, break out of besieged Kairouan (Tunisia). He scatters the Berbers, and in the following months he reconquers all lands lost during the Revolt in Morocco and South of it. 

 Asia 
 Emperor Xuan Zong begins to favor Taoism over Buddhism, adopting the new reign title Tianbao ("Heavenly Treasures"), to indicate his divine mandate. The total number of enlisted troops in the Tang armies has risen to about half a million, due to Xuan Zongs's earlier military reforms.
 For the municipal census of the Chinese capital city Chang'an and its metropolitan area of Jingzhou (including small towns in the vicinity), the New Book of Tang records that in this year there are 362,921 registered families with 1,960,188 people. 
 Li Bai (also Li Po), Chinese poet, is summoned by Xuan Zong to attend the imperial court. He and his friend Du Fu become the two most prominent figures in the flourishing of Chinese poetry, during the mid-Tang Dynasty.

 By topic 
 Religion 
 After a 40-year vacancy, Stephen IV becomes Orthodox patriarch of Antioch, at the suggestion of caliph Hisham ibn Abd al-Malik.
 Chrodegang, chancellor of Charles Martel, is appointed bishop of Metz and embarks on a reorganisation of the Frankish church. 
 Sturm, disciple of Boniface, establishes the Benedictine Abbey of Fulda (present-day Hesse) in Germany (or 744).
 The Holy Face of Lucca is transferred to Lucca from Luni (approximate date).

Births 
 Charlemagne, king and emperor of the Franks (approximate date)
 De Zong, emperor of the Tang Dynasty (d. 805)
 Himiltrude, wife of Charlemagne (approximate date)
 Ibrahim al-Mawsili, musician and singer (d. 804)
 Liu Congyi, chancellor of the Tang Dynasty (d. 785) 
 Ludger, Frisian missionary (approximate date)
 Muhammad ibn Mansur al-Mahdi, Muslim caliph (or 745)
 Odo of Metz, Frankish architect (d. 814)

Deaths 
 Abd al-Malik ibn Katan al-Fihri, Arab governor
 Acca, bishop of Hexham (or 740) 
 Áed Balb mac Indrechtaig, king of Connacht (Ireland)
 Balj ibn Bishr al-Qushayri, Arab general and governor
 Cathal mac Finguine, king of Munster (Ireland)
 Itzamnaaj B'alam II, ruler of Yaxchilan (b. 647)
 Liutfrid, duke of Alsace (approximate date) 
 Niu Xianke, chancellor of the Tang Dynasty (b. 675)
 Ōno no Azumabito, Japanese samurai and official 
 Orso Ipato, doge of Venice
 Wang Zhihuan, Chinese poet (b. 688)

References